The Resident Commissioner was the highest authority present in the Cook Islands between 1901 and 1965. The post was created on 11 June 1901 when New Zealand took over responsibility for the islands, replacing the British Resident, and was succeeded by the New Zealand High Commissioner. The post-holder was also the presiding officer of the Legislative Council from 1946 until 1957.

List of resident commissioners
The following table is a complete list of resident commissioners from 1901 to 1965:

References

 
Government of the Cook Islands
Cook Islands